Anna Fairman (born October 13, 2000), also known by the Chinese name Fei Anna, is an American ice hockey defenceman and member of the Chinese women's national ice hockey team. She competed in the 2022 Winter Olympics.

Career
Fairman played college ice hockey at Robert Morris University. She was a three-time state champion in Michigan and won two silver medals while competing in the under-19 US nationals in 2018 and 2019. She started playing professional ice hockey in 2021, joining KRS Vanke Rays. She was a member of the Chinese team at the 2022 Winter Olympics. She went viral on TikTok during the Olympic games for posting videos documenting her time in the Olympic village. She now plays at Long Island University.

References

2000 births
Living people
Ice hockey players at the 2022 Winter Olympics
Olympic ice hockey players of China
People from Troy, Michigan
Robert Morris Colonials women's ice hockey players
American women's ice hockey defensemen
American emigrants to China
Naturalized citizens of the People's Republic of China